Nagercoil Municipal Corporation is located in Kanyakumari district. Nagercoil is the administrative headquarters of Kanyakumari district and it is located in southern Tamil Nadu. The corporation is located 18 km north of Kanyakumari.  Nagercoil Corporation is a forum with 52 members.  At present Kottar, Vadasery and Vetturnimadam are the important places in Nagercoil Corporation. The annual tax revenue of this corporation is 81 crore rupees.

History 
Nagercoil Municipality was established in 1920 during the reign of Travancore State. In 1947, Nagercoil was upgraded to a primary municipality.
Kanyakumari district, which was part of the princely state of Travancore, was annexed to Tamil Nadu on 1 November 1956 as a result of the Kumari liberation struggle. When it became a district of Tamil Nadu, Nagercoil municipality was upgraded to a secondary municipality in 1956 and then to a primary municipality in 1961.  It was later upgraded to an elective municipality on 12 October 1978 and a special status municipality from 30 May 1988. Then, on 14 February 2019,  Nagercoil Municipality was upgraded to Municipal Corporation by former Chief minister of TamilNadu Edappadi K. Palanisamy.

Administration

Elections 
The seats of the Mayor, Deputy Mayor and the corporation council of the Nagercoil Municipal Corporation have been vacant since 2016. As part of the 2022 Tamil Nadu urban civic body elections, the Nagercoil Corporation went to polling on 19 February 2022, alongside 20 other municipal corporations of Tamil Nadu, to elect 52 councillors to represent the city's 52 wards; the councillors will choose one amongst themselves as the Mayor of Nagercoil. The election results were announced on 22 February 2022 by the Tamil Nadu State Election Commission. The Dravida Munnetra Kazhagam (DMK) won 24 out of the total 52 wards in Nagercoil, with the other parties in its Secular Progressive Alliance winning 8 more seats—7 for Indian National Congress, 1 for Marumalarchi Dravida Munnetra Kazhagam (MDMK). The All India Anna Dravida Munnetra Kazhagam (AIADMK) won 7 seats. The Bharatiya Janata Party (BJP), the ruling party of the Union Government of India, won 11 seats. Aside parties, two independent candidates won in their respective wards.

Important information

Administrative Areas 
Covering an area of 61.36  km2, Nagercoil Corporation consisted of former Nagercoil village, Vadiveeswaram village, Vadasery village and Neendakarai village. Currently, the Asaripallam Town Panchayat is annexed to the Nagercoil municipality.  The corporation functions as a forum with 52 members.

References

External links
Municipal Commissioner, Nagercoil
Nagercoil Corporation

Nagercoil
Municipal corporations in Tamil Nadu